Timir Datta is an Indian-American physicist specializing in high transition temperature superconductors and a professor of physics in the department of Physics and Astronomy at the University of South Carolina, in Columbia, South Carolina.

Early life and education
Datta grew up in India along with elder brother Jyotirmoy Datta a noted journalist; his father B.N. Dutt a scion of two land owning families from Khulna and Jessore in south central Bengal (British India) was an eminent sugar-refining engineer and on his mother's side a relative of Michael Madhusudan Dutt, the famed poet. He received a master's degree in theoretical plasma physics from Boston College in 1974 under the direction of Gabor Kalman. Datta also worked at the Jet Propulsion laboratory (JPL) in Pasadena, California, as a pre-doctoral NASA research associate of Robert Somoano. He also collaborated with Carl H. Brans at Loyola University New Orleans on a gravitational problem of frame dragging and worked with John Perdew on the behavior of charge density waves in jellium. Datta is of Bengali origin.

Work and research history

Datta was a NSF post-doctoral fellow with Marvin Silver and studied charge propagation in non-crystalline systems at the University of North Carolina in Chapel Hill. At UNC-CH he continued his theoretical interests and worked on retarded Vander Waals potential with L. H. Ford.  Since 1982, he has been on the faculty of the University of South Carolina in Columbia.

He collaborated with several laboratories involved with the early discoveries of high temperature superconductivity, especially the team at NRL, led by Donald U Gubser and Stuart Wolf. This research group at USC was the also first to observe  (i) bulk Meissner effect in Tl-copper oxides and thus confirm the discovery by Allen Herman's team at the University of Arkansas of high temperature superconductivity in these compounds. He coined the term "triple digit superconductivity", and his group was the first to observe (ii) fractional quantum hall effect in 3-dimensional carbon.

In a paper with Raphael Tsu he derived the first quantum mechanical wave impedance formula for Schrödinger wave functions. He was also the first to show that Bragg's law of X-ray scattering from crystals is a direct consequence of Euclidean length invariance of the incident wave vector; in fact Max von Laue's three diffraction equations are not independent but related by length conservation.

Datta is an active researcher, with over 100 papers listed in the SAO/NASA Astrophysics Data System (ADS) as of 2014.

Patents
Datta was issued one US patent in 1995: "Flux-trapped superconducting magnets and method of manufacture", with two co-inventors.

Anti-gravity work
Datta was involved in the university-funded development of a "Gravity Generator" in 1996 and 1997, with then-fellow university researcher Douglas Torr. According to a leaked document from the Office of Technology Transfer at the University of South Carolina and confirmed to Wired reporter Charles Platt in 1998, the device would create a "force beam" in any desired direction and the university planned to patent and license this device. Neither information about this university research project nor any "Gravity Generator" device was ever made public.

Despite the apparent less than successful outcome of the "Gravity Generator" development effort with Torr, Datta became interested in the effects of electric fields on gravitation, expanding on Torr's theoretical work on the subject.

Selected publications

See also
 Eugene Podkletnov
 Ning Li (physicist)

References

External links
Department of Physics and Astronomy at the University of South Carolina
Timir Datta's page at the University of South Carolina

University of South Carolina faculty
Morrissey College of Arts & Sciences alumni
American people of Indian descent
General relativity
Gravity
Quantum mechanics
Superconductivity
Anti-gravity
Year of birth missing (living people)
Living people